Ivan "John" Jurkovic (born August 18, 1967) is a former American football player currently employed as a broadcaster. He grew up in Calumet City, Illinois.

Jurkovic played professionally as a defensive tackle for the Green Bay Packers, Jacksonville Jaguars, and Cleveland Browns. Jurkovic was a fan favorite in Green Bay for his boisterous personality. He attended Thornton Fractional North High School and Eastern Illinois University.

Jurkovic also was a reserve color commentator for the NFL on FOX from 2001-2001, and is now a midday show host on ESPN Radio 1000 in Chicago along with Carmen DeFalco.

His younger brother, Mirko Jurkovic, played football with him at Thornton Fractional North High School and then on the offensive line at the University of Notre Dame where he was an All-American. Mirko died January 9, 2013 from cancer.

He is of Croatian descent.

References

1967 births
Living people
American football defensive tackles
Eastern Illinois Panthers football players
Green Bay Packers players
Jacksonville Jaguars players
Cleveland Browns players
American sports announcers
German players of American football
American people of Croatian descent
Radio personalities from Chicago
People from Friedrichshafen
Sportspeople from Tübingen (region)
People from Calumet City, Illinois
Arena football announcers
National Football League announcers
Sportspeople from the Chicago metropolitan area